The 2000/01 FIS Freestyle Skiing World Cup was the twenty second World Cup season in freestyle skiing organised by International Ski Federation. The season started on 12 August 2000 and ended on 11 March 2001. This season included two disciplines: aerials and moguls. Dual moguls title was not awarded because of only one event on both sides of world cup calendar.

Men

Moguls

Aerials

Ladies

Moguls

Aerials

Men's standings

Overall 

Standings after 15 races.

Moguls 

Standings after 7 races.

Aerials 

Standings after 7 races.

Ladies' standings

Overall 

Standings after 15 races.

Moguls 

Standings after 7 races.

Aerials 

Standings after 7 races.

Nations Cup

Overall 

Standings after 30 races.

Men 

Standings after 15 races.

Ladies 

Standings after 15 races.

References

External links

FIS Freestyle Skiing World Cup
World Cup
World Cup